Igor Skvarica (born 26 August 1986) is a Bosnian actor who has performed in film, television, theatre and radio.

He is best known for his roles in television sitcom Konak kod Hilmije (2018–2019) as Durmiš and in films Chefurs Raus! (2013), With Mom (2013), The Prosecutor the Defender the Father and His Son (2015). He also played an exciting role of Beslan in the last season of the Sean Bean starring TV Series Legends (2015).

His theatre work includes appearances in "Stones in His Pockets"(Marie Jones), "The Life Before Us" (Romain Gary), "Animal farm" (George Orwell), "The Lower Depths" (Maxim Gorky), "A Streetcar Named Desire" (Tennessee Williams). Skvarica studied acting at the Academy of Performing Arts in Sarajevo.

Filmography

Feature films 

 Fearing in Sarajevo (2016)
 The Prosecutor the Defender the Father and His Son (2015)
 With Mom (2013)
 Chefurs Raus! (2013)

Shorts 

 Big Leap (2018)
Breath (2018)
 Kisa iz vedra neba (2016)
 The Wall (2014)
 Da vam nacrtam (2011)

Television 
 Konak kod Hilmije (2018–2019)
 Legends (TV series) (2015)
 Lud, zbunjen, normalan (2015)

References

External links 
 

Bosnia and Herzegovina male film actors
Bosnia and Herzegovina male television actors
21st-century Bosnia and Herzegovina male actors
Living people
Bosniaks of Bosnia and Herzegovina
Actors from Tuzla
Bosnia and Herzegovina male stage actors
1986 births